The 2014 Arab Junior Athletics Championships was the sixteenth edition of the international athletics competition for under-20 athletes from Arab countries. It took place between 23–26 April in Cairo, Egypt. It was the fifth time that the Egyptian capital hosted the event. A total of 44 athletics events were contested, 22 for men and 22 for women.

The host nation Egypt comfortably topped the medal table with seventeen gold medals  and 47 in total. Bahrain was the next most successful country with 14 golds among its 28 medals. Algeria was a distant third with 19 medals, but only three gold.

The competition saw successful runs by Kenyan-born athletes for Bahrain, including the reigning senior Asian steeplechase champion Ruth Jebet and Asian runner-up in the 400 m, Ali Khamis Abbas, who won a 400 m hurdles and flat double in Cairo. Three other athletes achieved double at the tournament: Salwa Eid Naser won the women's 200 metres and 400 metres, her Bahraini compatriot Makonine Dissa Djissa won the women's middle-distance double, and Egypt's Esraa Mohamed Samir won the women's horizontal jumps.

Medal summary

Men

Women

Medal table

References

Results
2014 Arab Junior Championships Results . Arab Athletics Federation. Retrieved on 2016-07-04.

Arab Junior Athletics Championships
International athletics competitions hosted by Egypt
Sports competitions in Cairo
Arab Junior Athletics Championships
Arab Junior Athletics Championships
2014 in youth sport
Athletics in Cairo